Rebecca Jo Budig is an American actress and television presenter. Her career began in 1993, and in 1995, she was cast in the role of Michelle Bauer on the CBS soap opera Guiding Light. In 1999, she was cast as Greenlee Smythe on the ABC soap opera All My Children; she held the role off-and-on until the network series finale in 2011. In 2015, she was cast in the role of Hayden Barnes on General Hospital. In 2019, Budig was cast on L.A.'s Finest, as Carlene Hart, a drug-trafficking soccer mom.

Early life and education
Budig was born in Cincinnati, Ohio, the daughter of Mary Jo, a homemaker, and George Budig, a businessman. She was raised in Fort Mitchell, Kentucky. She graduated from the Cincinnati Public Schools School for Creative and Performing Arts (SCPA)  and later went on to major in zoology at Miami University in Ohio. In 1993, Budig moved to Los Angeles, California, to pursue an acting career. While there, she began studying with acting coaches Howard Fine and Jay Goldenberg at the Howard Fine Acting Studio and at the Young Actors Space, respectively.

Career
Budig's first acting job was in Aerosmith's music video "Livin' on the Edge". She later had a cameo role as a teenage girl saved by Chris O'Donnell's character Dick Grayson in Batman Forever.

In 1995, Budig auditioned for the role of Kelsey Jefferson on All My Children, but received an offer from Guiding Light, where she began her three-year stint as Michelle Bauer from (1995 to 1998).

Budig played the role of Patty in Captain Nuke and the Bomber Boys in 1995. She then portrayed Babsy in the 1996 film God's Lonely Man, followed by James Dean: A Race with Destiny where she played actress Natalie Wood and Bonehead Detectives in the Paleo World where she played Allie. Both films were released in 1997.

Budig's most famous role has been that of the spoiled, rich girl-turned-makeup company executive Greenlee Smythe on All My Children—a role which she originated on August 11, 1999. Greenlee was supposed to be a recurring role, but executives enjoyed Budig and offered her a three-year contract. While on All My Children, Budig garnered accolades from fans and press for her performance on the soap opera, as well as her character's pairing with Josh Duhamel's Leo du Pres. She was nominated for a Daytime Emmy Award for Outstanding Supporting Actress in a Drama Series in 2001 and again in 2003. Her onscreen pairing with Duhamel earned them a Daytime Emmy Award nomination as well, for America's Favorite Couple in 2002. She was often called "Little Budig" by Duhamel, who had given her the nickname. In 2003, Budig won a Soap Opera Digest Award for Outstanding Younger Lead Actress. In November 2005, Budig left the show to relocate to California.

Other notable roles include co-hosting The Sports Illustrated for Kids Show. Budig worked for the World Wrestling Federation as an interviewer for a short time on Sunday Night HEAT in 2000. She has made appearances on Out of Practice, as well as on Hope & Faith.  She did a movie called The Perfect Child (2007) featured on Lifetime with the leading role as Sarah Daniels. In addition, Budig has been seen on CSI playing a role as a murdered lap dancer (Season 8, Episodes 9 & 10).

It was confirmed in late 2007 that Budig would be returning to All My Children as Greenlee Smythe, the role she originated. She had been replaced by another actress Sabine Singh earlier that year. She returned to the show in January 2008. However, she signed a limited contract with the show. Later, while rumors circulated of Budig's departure, she confirmed in October 2008 that she would be leaving the series again in February 2009. Budig cited the reason for her departure as wanting to return to the West Coast to be with her husband. Budig returned to 'All My Children in late December 2009 (when the show relocated production to Los Angeles), and remained with the series until its series finale in September 2011.

In 2010, Budig won the first and only season of the ABC show Skating with the Stars. The show paired celebrities with professional ice skaters, who competed each week. Since September 2013, she began co-hosting the syndicated lifestyle television show Better, alongside JD Roberto.  In 2012, she appeared with Janeane Garofalo in the comedic movie Bad Parents. In February 2015, it was announced that Budig had been cast on General Hospital in an unknown "killer" role. She debuted the role of Hayden Barnes on March 20, 2015. On June 27, 2017, it was announced that Budig had been let go from General Hospital, with her dismissal cited as a "storyline necessity". On May 9, 2019, it was announced that she would reprise the role of Hayden Barnes on General Hospital. On June 27, 2019, it was announced that Budig would return in July; returning during the final moments of the July 8, 2019, episode. However, on November 20, 2019, Budig's exit was confirmed once more; she made her last appearance on November 27, 2019.

Personal life
Budig is the youngest of eight children. She has five sisters and two brothers. In 2000, Budig married Dr. Daniel Geller; the marriage only lasted several months.
 
She met former Bachelor star Bob Guiney while hosting The Bachelor repeat shows on ABC Family. The two were married on July 3, 2004. On January 13, 2010, People Magazine reported that Budig and Guiney had decided to split, with Budig filing for divorce in April 2010.

Budig became engaged to television marketing executive Michael Benson on Christmas Day in 2010. The pair married in 2012. On May 1, 2014, Budig announced that she was five months pregnant with the couple's first baby. On September 8, 2014, Budig gave birth to a daughter.

Filmography

Film

Television

Awards and nominations

See also

Leo du Pres and Greenlee Smythe

References

External links

Rebecca Budig Talks About Daytime Return
Soap Opera Central profile of Rebecca Budig

Actresses from Kentucky
American film actresses
American soap opera actresses
American television actresses
Living people
Miami University alumni
Participants in American reality television series
People from Kenton County, Kentucky
Professional wrestling announcers
Reality show winners
20th-century American actresses
21st-century American actresses
Actresses from Cincinnati
Year of birth missing (living people)